Vendetta di zingara (meaning 'The Gypsy Woman's Revenge' in English)  is a 1950 Italian film directed by Aldo Molinari.

Cast
Felga Lauri as Fiamma
Anna Vita as Myrka
Sergio Raimondi as Sergio
Maria Piazzai
Domenico Tosi
Marisa Benedetti
Rosario Borelli
Anita Davila
Silvia Fazi
Luciano Brancucci
Giovanni Lovatelli
Bruno Tocci

References

External links
 

1950 films
1950s Italian-language films
Italian black-and-white films
1950s Italian films